One Great Love is a 2018 Filipino romance drama film directed by Eric Quizon, starring Dennis Trillo and Kim Chiu together with J. C. de Vera.

The movie is an official entry to the 2018 Metro Manila Film Festival.

Plot 
The story revolves around Zyra Paez (Kim Chiu), whose First relationship with Carl Mauricio (J. C. de Vera) has failed. She decides to give their relationship one more try, but soon finds herself filled with doubt over her life choices. The situation gets even more complex when she meets and befriends Ian Arcano (Dennis Trillo), a heart doctor who later become her confidante, leaving her trying to decide whether he may be “the one”.

Cast

 Dennis Trillo as Dr. Ian Arcano
 Kim Chiu as Zyra Paez
 J. C. de Vera as Carl Mauricio
 Eric Quizon as Dante Paez
 Miles Ocampo as Jemy Paez
 Marlo Mortel as Bryan
 Niña Dolino as Annie

References

External links
 

2018 films
2010s Tagalog-language films
Philippine romantic drama films
Regal Entertainment films
2018 romantic drama films
2010s English-language films
Films directed by Eric Quizon